Vermont Route 132 (VT 132) is a  state highway in eastern Vermont, United States. It runs east to west from VT 14 in Sharon in the west to U.S. Route 5 (US 5) in Norwich  from the New Hampshire border in the east. The segment of VT 132 from VT 14 to the ramp from I-89 northbound is maintained by the state; the remainder is town-maintained.

Route description 
VT 132 begins at an intersection with VT 14 in the Windsor County town of Sharon. Passing Sharon Elementary School, the route enters an extended diamond interchange with Interstate 89 (exit 2). At the end of this interchange, maintenance changes from VTrans to the town of Sharon. VT 132 continues northeast through the town of Sharon as a two-lane highway, passing residences on the hills overlooking I-89.

Soon the route bends further to the northeast, becoming more rural and wooded in nature. Winding northeast, the route soon reaches a junction with Beaver Meadow Road before bending northward into the woods near Maple Ridge Lane. At the junction with Highlake Road, the route goes from north to northeast, passing a junction with Cross Road before crossing the line into Orange County. Crossing through dense woods, the route enters the town of Strafford. Now maintained by the town of Strafford, the route bends northeast out of the woods and past numerous residences on the bottom of a ridge.

Now running eastward, VT 132 bends northeast into the hamlet of South Strafford, intersecting the Justin Morrill Memorial Highway. At this junction, VT 132 turns eastward, becoming the main road through South Strafford. Through South Strafford, the route begins paralleling the west branch of the Ompompanoosuc River and reaching a junction with Mine Road, where it turns north. Crossing and paralleling the river, the route bends east and parallels the waterway into the hamlet of Copper Flat. VT 132 begins running southeast and east through woods in Strafford, crossing into the town of Thetford.

At Miller Pond Road, the route continues winding along the riverside bending southeast into the hamlet of Rices Mills. The main route through Rices Mills, VT 132 runs south through the dense woods nearby the river, which runs east at this point. Turning south, the route soon crosses the Windsor County line, entering the town of Norwich. VT 132 runs south through Union Village, a nearby hamlet before turning southeast at Union Village Road. Paralleling the river, VT 132 remains a two-lane rural road through Norwich, crossing under I-91 with no interchange. After another bend along the Ompompanoosuc River, the route reaches a junction with US 5 near the Connecticut River.

Major intersections

References

External links

132
Transportation in Orange County, Vermont
Transportation in Windsor County, Vermont